John J. Mertens was a member of the South Dakota House of Representatives and the South Dakota Senate.

Biography
Mertens was born on July 16, 1869 in Two Rivers, Wisconsin. He attended Hamline University and served in the United States Army, achieving the rank of captain.

Political career
Mertens was a member of the House of Representatives from 1909 to 1912 and of the Senate from 1921 to 1924. He was a Republican.

References

People from Two Rivers, Wisconsin
Republican Party South Dakota state senators
Republican Party members of the South Dakota House of Representatives
Military personnel from Wisconsin
United States Army officers
Hamline University alumni
1869 births
Year of death missing